Kahit Isang Saglit (International title: A Time For Us / ) is a Filipino drama television series produced by ABS-CBN and Double Vision. It aired in the Philippines in primetime from Monday through Friday and was aired both in Malaysia and Singapore. It aired from September 15 to November 28, 2008 replacing My Girl and was replaced by Eva Fonda.

The show was dedicated to its first director, Gilbert Guevarra Perez, who died in 2008. In 2009, it was nominated on the Seoul International Drama Awards and recently the series garnered a nomination for the 37th International Emmy Award for Telenovelas.

Synopsis
Rocky Santillan's (Jericho Rosales) father was a policeman who was murdered. His mother suffered from a fatal heart attack as she mourned her husband's lifeless body on the beach. Margaret/Garie (Carmen Soo) was very happy to see her father, Ronaldo Dimaandal (Albert Martinez), again and was excited to spend time with both her mom & dad, but she awoke the next morning to find out he had gone again. Garie and her mom then went to live with a relative who didn't too think much of her dad (Garie's Grandmother and Eunice's mother).

After 15 years, Rocky has become a PDEA Agent and has gone to Malaysia for an important assignment. While in Malaysia, he secretly leads an investigation into his father's death, which remains unsolved though Rocky can still remember the face of the man who visited his dad before he was murdered (Garie's dad). Meanwhile, Garie still yearns for her father. She still believes that her father left against his will and plans to go to the Philippines to look for him.

One busy day, when both of them are in a rush, they collide and fall into each other's arms.

Cast and characters

Protagonist 
 Jericho Rosales as Francisco 'Rocky' Santillan, Jr.
 Carmen Soo as Margaret 'Garie' Hang-Li

Lead cast 
 Christopher de Leon as Dir. Gen. Anthony Mondragon
 Albert Martinez as Ronaldo Dimaandal
 Cristine Reyes as Alona Mondragon

Main cast 
 Soosan Hoh as Eunice Hang-Li
 Louisa Chong as "Popo" Jenny Hang-Li
 Malou de Guzman as Auntie Marian Santillan
 Isabel Rivas as Vivian Mondragon
 Awal Ashaari as Amir Mohammad
 Zayanah Ibrahim as Anis
 Dick Israel as Commander Matteo Padilla
 Empoy Marquez as Nestor
 Wilma Doesnt as Mona
 Neil Ryan Sese as Commander Rene Ilagan

Supporting cast 
 Nanding Josef as Serbio
 Laarni Rivera as Allona
 Beatriz Saw as Attorney Espinosa
 Zeppi Boromeo as Agent Dipong
 Marvin Raymundo as Agent Monching
 Roxanne Barcelo as Trisha

Guest cast 
 Erynne Erynna as Young Garie
 Pilar Pilapil
 Shamaine Centenera-Buencamino as Mrs. Barbara Reyes
 Nonie Buencamino as Francisco Santillan, Sr.
 Glenda Garcia as Elena Santillan
 Joem Bascon as Young Ronaldo
 Rafael Rosell as Young Anthony
 Winryll Banaag as Joshua
 Lauren Novero as Edgar
 Rico Barrera as the drug dealer
 Josh Ivan Morales

References

ABS-CBN drama series
2008 Philippine television series debuts
2008 Philippine television series endings
Philippine action television series
Television series by Star Creatives
Television shows filmed in Malaysia
Television shows filmed in the Philippines
2008 Malaysian television series debuts
2008 Malaysian television series endings
Philippine romance television series
Filipino-language television shows